The 2011 ACC Men's Soccer Tournament was the  25th edition of the tournament, which determined the men's college soccer champion of the Atlantic Coast Conference, as well as the conference's automatic berth into the 2011 NCAA Division I Men's Soccer Championship. The tournament began on November 7, with N.C. State defeating Virginia Tech 1–0 in a play-in fixture. The ACC Championship was played on November 13 at WakeMed Soccer Park in Cary, North Carolina with North Carolina defeating Boston College 3–1 in the final.

As ACC Champions, North Carolina qualified for the 2011 NCAA Division I Men's Soccer Championship, and would eventually win the national championship, making it the second time in the last two years an ACC school won the national tournament. Additionally five ACC schools qualified for the tournament through at-large bids, the most of any conference.

The defending champions, Maryland, were eliminated by Clemson in the quarterfinals of the tournament.

Qualification

Bracket

Schedule 

The home team/higher seed is listed on the right.

Play-in round

Quarterfinals

Semifinals

ACC Championship

See also 
 Atlantic Coast Conference
 2011 Atlantic Coast Conference men's soccer season
 2011 in American soccer
 2011 NCAA Division I Men's Soccer Championship
 2011 NCAA Division I men's soccer season

References 

-
ACC Men's Soccer Tournament
ACC Men's Soccer Tournament
ACC Men's Soccer Tournament